Sea Drift is a tone poem for orchestra composed by John Alden Carpenter in 1933; it was premiered by the Chicago Symphony under Frederick Stock on November 30, 1933.[1]  Impressionist music inspired by the Walt Whitman poems Sea-Drift, it is in two sections.  Much of the material in the first part is assigned to the horn; in the second, the main theme is stated by the English horn before being repeated by strings.

See also
Sea-Drift, for other works inspired by these poems.

References
[1] http://archives.nyphil.org/index.php/artifact/78b1daf8-98c4-4a8e-af55-7cd55a70e654/fullview#page/4/mode/2up

David Ewen, Encyclopedia of Concert Music.  New York; Hill and Wang, 1959.

Compositions by John Alden Carpenter
1933 compositions
Symphonic poems
Musical settings of poems by Walt Whitman